Kenoth Govindan Adiyodi (1937–2001) was an Indian zoologist, author, and administrator. He was a member of the Union Public Service Commission of India (UPSC) at the time of his death in 2001.

Dr. K. G. Adiyodi’s scientific achievements include founding the International Society for Invertebrate Reproduction, launching the Society’s International Journal of Invertebrate Reproduction, and publishing a 12 volume, 18 book treatise titled Reproductive Biology of Invertebrates with his wife and former Rhodes Visiting Fellow, Dr. Rita G. Adiyodi.

Dr. K.G. Adiyodi served as Vice Chancellor of Cochin University of Science and Technology and as Dean of Faculty of Science, University of Calicut.

Life and career

Early life and education 

Kenoth Govindan Adiyodi was born in 1937 at Peralam, a village in the Kannur District of Kerala State, to Kavil Kambrath Govinda Poduval and Kenoth Lakshmi Pillayathiri Amma. After his initial schooling at Payyanur, he completed his Intermediate (Pre-University) from St. Aloysius College, Mangalore in 1955 and graduated with a B.Sc. (Hons) in Zoology from Madras Christian College in 1958. He completed his MA from University of Madras. He moved to Thiruvananthapuram in 1964 to work on a research project funded by the Ford Foundation and was awarded a doctorate degree by Kerala University in 1970 for his work on Insect Neuroendocrinology under the supervision of Dr. K.K. Nayar.

Career 

Dr. Adiyodi began his teaching career as Lecturer at St. Agnes College, Karnataka University, Mangalore (1958–1959). He was also Lecturer at St. Joseph's College, Devagiri (1959–1964).

Dr. Adiyodi joined University of Calicut in 1970 where he served as Reader in Zoology (1970 to 1977), Professor of Invertebrate Reproductive Physiology (1977 to 1994), and Dean of Faculty of Science (1988 to 1991).

Dr. Adiyodi was Vice-Chancellor, Cochin University of Science and Technology (1994–1996) and was the first Malayali to serve as a member of the Union Public Service Commission of India (1996–2001).

Academic achievements 

Dr. Adiyodi began his research career in insect physiology. His research interests turned to crustacean reproduction and growth after his marriage to Rita Gomez in 1966 who was then doing research work on growth, regeneration, and reproduction in land crabs. Dr. Adiyodi published in many international journals including Journal of Insect Physiology, Journal of Morphology, Biological Bulletin, General & Comparative Endocrinology, and Experientia (now Cellular and Molecular Life Sciences). His work “Endocrine Control of Reproduction in Decapod Crustacea” published in Biological Reviews, Cambridge Philosophical Society (1970) was a notable landmark in his scientific career.

International Society for Invertebrate Reproduction  

It was while attending an international conference on comparative endocrinology in London in the early 1970s that Dr. K.G. Adiyodi felt the need to bring all areas of invertebrate reproductive biology into a comprehensive discipline of its own. Until then, studies on comparative endocrinology were mostly on vertebrates. His discussions with many like-minded participants at the London conference motivated him to take the initial steps to organize an international symposium dedicated to invertebrate reproduction.

The first International Symposium on Reproductive Physiology of Invertebrates (ISIR) was organised by Dr. K. G. Adiyodi and Dr. Rita G. Adiyodi at University of Calicut (1975). The International Society for Invertebrate Reproduction was founded at the Calicut symposium and ISIR was recognized as the first international symposium organized by the Society. Advances in Invertebrate Reproduction (Vol.I) published in 1977 was based on proceedings of the inaugural symposium.

The International Society of Invertebrate Reproduction held its second symposium at University of California, Davis (1978) where Dr. Adiyodi was honoured with an honorary plaque as the Society’s Founder. Dr. K. G. Adiyodi was Founder Secretary General of the Society from 1975 to 1986. The Society later expanded its scope to include invertebrate development and renamed itself as the International Society of Invertebrate Reproduction and Development. The Society’s meetings are now called the International Congress of Invertebrate Reproduction and Development (ICIRD).

International Journal for ISIR 

The Adiyodis moved to University of Oxford when Dr. Rita Adiyodi won the Rhodes Visiting Fellowship in 1976 and Dr. K.G. Adiyodi joined her on another assignment in 1977. Dr. Adiyodi started work on launching an international journal for ISIR in 1977 while at Oxford and his efforts bore fruition when Elsevier Biomedical Press, Amsterdam agreed to publish the journal after a favourable feasibility study. The journal was named International Journal of Invertebrate Reproduction and went to print in 1979. Dr. Adiyodi served as the editor-in-chief of the new publication with Prof. K. G. Davey of York University, Canada and Dr. K. C. Highnam of University of Sheffield, UK as associate editors. The journal was renamed the International Journal of Invertebrate Reproduction and Development in 1984, and then, the Invertebrate Reproduction and Development.
Balaban Press, Israel later took over the publication of the journal from Elsevier Biomedical Press. Volume 41, Numbers 1-3 (September 2002) issue of this journal, published by Balaban Press was dedicated to the memory of Dr. Adiyodi. The journal is currently published by Taylor & Francis.

Reproductive Biology of Invertebrates (RBI) – a multi-volume treatise 

The groundwork for putting together a multi-volume treatise on the reproductive biology of invertebrates was made when the Adiyodis were at Oxford University. The treatise was originally planned in six volumes on a thematic basis. Dr. Boullin initiated this project at John Wiley & Sons, Inc. in 1978 and Dr. Stephen D. Thornton, helped with its work as Publishing Editor, Life Sciences. Volume I of the treatise was published in 1982. Some operational changes following the release of Volume II in 1983 led to the signing of a partnership with Oxford & IBH, New Delhi for the Indian Editions of the treatise from Volume III onwards. John Wiley & Sons, Inc. continued to publish the international editions. With the release of Volume VI Part B (1994), the Adiyodis completed all six planned volumes (eight books) of the original series. Subsequent volumes, collectively named as the Progress Series, were guest-edited by scientists of international standing. A total of 18 books were published in the 12 volume, RBI series, the last in 2005.

Titles of books in the treatise

Popular scientific literature 

Dr. Adiyodi was the Founder Secretary of the Kerala Sastra Sahitya Parishad, a not-for-profit organization and one of India’s largest popular science organizations. He also served as the President of Deseeya Sastra Vedi (National Science Forum), a similar organization.

Dr. Adiyodi was a prolific writer in English and Malayalam. His first book Theyyavum Thirayum was published when he was an intermediate student. Jeevante Udbhavavum Bhaviyum won him the M.P. Paul Prize in 1965. Dr. Adiyodi’s Keralathile Vishapambukal, a book on the poisonous snakes of Kerala was published in the weekly edition of Mathrubhumi in the early 1960s. Pradhamika Janthusastram written for teaching Zoology at the undergraduate level was published by the Kerala Sahitya Academy in 1967.

Vice-Chancellor of Cochin University of Science & Technology 

Dr. Adiyodi served as Vice-Chancellor of Cochin University of Science and Technology from 1994 to 1996. Collaborative partnerships in teaching and research with reputed universities around the world during this time helped bring Cochin University into national and international focus. Dr. Adiyodi secured the prestigious MHO-Partnership Programme of the Government of Netherlands for CUSAT which allowed the University to receive financial grants from the Dutch government. The Dutch government selects one University from each partner country.

Leadership roles 

Dr. Adiyodi served in various leadership roles, some of which are listed below:

Visiting assignments

Recognition & awards

Notable publications

Personal life

Death 
Dr. K.G. Adiyodi died May 28, 2001 in New Delhi following a cardiac arrest.

Family 
Dr. K.G. Adiyodi is survived by his wife Dr. Rita G. Adiyodi and their children (Nirmal and Laxmi).

References 

Indian zoologists
1937 births
2001 deaths